Victoria de Grazia is the Moore Collegiate Professor of History at Columbia University and founding editor of Radical History Review.

Biography 
De Grazia comes from a family of academics. Her father was Alfred de Grazia, New York University political scientist and decorated World War II veteran specialized in Psychological operations. Among her uncles were Pulitzer Prize-winning author Sebastian de Grazia and first amendment lawyer and co-founder of Cardozo Law School Edward de Grazia.

De Grazia was educated at Smith College, University of Florence, and Columbia University where she received her Ph.D. in history with distinction in 1976. She taught at the European University Institute, Rutgers University, and the City College of New York before joining the Columbia University faculty. Her research focuses on twentieth-century European history and consumer culture from a gendered and comparative perspective.

She was the recipient of a Guggenheim Fellowship in 1999. She was named to the American Academy of Arts and Sciences in 2005.

Publications 

 The Culture of Consent: Mass Organization of Leisure in Fascist Italy, Cambridge University Press, 1981
 How Fascism Ruled Women: Italy, 1922-1945, University of California Press, 1993
 The Sex of Things: Gender and Consumption in Historical Perspective, University of California Press, 1996
 Irresistible Empire: America’s Advance through Twentieth Century Europe, Belknap Press, 2005.
 The Perfect Fascist: A Story of Love, Power, and Morality in Mussolini’s Italy, Belknap Press, 2020
 Soft-Power Internationalism: Competing for Cultural Influence in the 21st-Century Global Order, Columbia University Press, 2021

Awards 
De Grazia received a Silver Independent Publisher Book Award in World History in 2021. She received the Modern Language Association's Scaglione Prize for her 2020 book The Perfect Fascist: A Story of Love, Power, and Morality in Mussolini’s Italy.

References 

Living people
Smith College alumni
University of Florence alumni
Columbia Graduate School of Arts and Sciences alumni
Columbia University faculty
20th-century American historians
21st-century American historians
American women historians
Historians of Italy
Rutgers University faculty
City University of New York faculty
European University Institute alumni
Year of birth missing (living people)